Green Valley Lake is an unincorporated community in San Bernardino County, California. It has a population of about 300. The ZIP Code is 92341 and the community is inside area code 909.

Location 
Green Valley Lake is located in the San Bernardino Mountains. The two closest neighboring towns are Arrowbear and Running Springs. 
The community is set at an elevation of 7,200 feet (2,195 m), and is the highest subdivision in the San Bernardino National Forest. There are 1,100 properties in the community and 300 full-time residents (according to post office records ). Green Valley Lake has a  lake.

The Lake 
The lake is not connected to any stream or river and is fed only by rain, snow, and underground springs. Fish are regularly stocked from May - August; the lake freezes over the winter.

Fishing 
Green Valley Lake is open for fishing from 5:30 AM to 8:00 PM
Fishing fees are $25.00 for adults, and $15.00 for children under 16.
Parking is free. There is no overnight parking or camping by the lake but there is a tent campground a mile to the east at the end of Green Valley Lake Road.
You must have a California state fishing license and all Fish and Game rules apply.
Each fisherman must have their own stringer the limit is (5) trout or (25) crappies.
All largemouth bass are to be released.
Bait fisherman must keep their catch.
Catch and release are with artificial lures ONLY.
Float tubes are not allowed.

There are also bass, andc rappie in the lake.

 The lake record rainbow trout is 15 Pounds, 2 ounces and was 30 inches long caught by local angler Chuck Jewell on 7/24/2016. This broke the long time record of 13.3 pounds.
 The lake record brown trout is 6 pounds, 2 ounces caught by local fisherman Greg Stephens.

History 
1880s   Timber claims made on Green Valley area by Highland Lumber Co.

1891   Highland Lumber builds City Creek Toll Rd. (Hwy 330) Took lumber from Fredalba to Molina Box Factory to make orange crates.

1892-94  Horse trail from Fredalba lumber camp to Big Bear widened into toll wagon road by Bear Valley Wagon Rd. Co.Eleven-room Toll House was near entrance to campground.  They gave the name of Green Valley to the area.

1893  San Bernardino National Forest "Reserve" created.

1894  Ben Pitts operates tollhouse each summer. Grows huge potatoes to serve guests.   Leaves in 1902 to open hotel in Redlands.

1899  Highland Lumber Co. bought out by Brookings Lumber Co.

1903  Tillitt family settles in Green Valley to run the tollhouse for Bear Valley Wagon Road Co. George and Demaris (May) have three children.  For 17 years they run tollhouse, general store, garage, and maintain the road. Send Jefferey Pine seeds to South Africa for British government. They spend winters at house on Del Rosa.

1904  Brookings hauls 27 ton locomotive up mountain by 6 wagons pulled by mules.

1911  County purchases toll road.  Brookings rail reaches almost to Green Valley. (Lighteningdale)

1912  Green Valley area clear-cut except for Tillit’s homestead area (now campground)

1913  Brookings sells out and moves to Oregon.   Most of the land bought by Marion Shay for cattle grazing.

1915  Trading Post and gas station built next to tollhouse. Tillitt improves Fawnskin road for automobiles for the county.

1923  Deep Creek Cutoff completed (Hwy 18) to Big Bear.  Nicknamed “Arctic Circle”.  Cuts off Green Valley.

1924  Harry McMullen (Green Valley Mac) buys up property with idea of the dam; he  sells the idea and the land to DeWitt-Blair Co. who are financed by Union Bank. Contractors Clinton, Code, & Hill design the dam, the subdivision, and a water system. Mac was a fishing guide that led parties on horseback to the Deep Creek area.

1925   San Bernardino National Forest created. “Inholdings” remain private property.

1926  Dam finished. First lots to sell were the Tillits homestead lots that were saved from the logging in 1912.

2007   Slide fire destroys app. 10% of town, including Fox Lumber and a real estate office.

Information gathered from [Green Valley Lake Homepage]

Weather 
The weather is quite variable. In the summer, temperatures regularly attain about 80 degrees Fahrenheit. The lake is usually frozen from December to February. Green Valley Lake receives considerable snowfall every year.

References

External links 
 Official site

Unincorporated communities in San Bernardino County, California
Unincorporated communities in California